The industrial rock band KMFDM has released more than two hundred songs in their over-thirty-year-long career spanning more than fifty unique releases.

Artwork 
Beginning with the British release of 1986's What Do You Know, Deutschland?, British artist Aidan "Brute!" Hughes has designed the artwork for nineteen of KMFDM's twenty-one studio albums and all but two of their singles. He has also designed the artwork for their three remix albums and two live albums, and their 2010 compilation releases.

All of his work shares a distinct visual style inspired by Golden Age comic artists, Russian Constructivists, Italian Futurists, and woodcut artists. The design and complexity of the works have varied over time from primarily simple mono- or bi-color motifs (early albums) to highly detailed multi-color schemes (Attak, WWIII).

The remaining cover artwork has been a mixture of photos and work done by other artists.

Albums

Studio albums

Live albums

Compilation albums

Remix albums

Collaborations

Singles/EPs 
Most of these singles have been reissued as special edition 7" records (limited to 250 copies each) from March 2008 to February 2010 in a series called 24/7.

Other appearances

Soundtracks

Compilations

References

Discography
Discographies of German artists
Rock music group discographies